The 1908 Pittsburgh Pirates season was the 27th season for the Pittsburgh Pirates franchise. The team finished tied for second place in the National League with the New York Giants, one game behind the Chicago Cubs. The Pirates spent 46 days in first place, and were on top on October 3. However, they lost their last game to the Cubs, which set up a replay of the infamous "Merkle" game between the Cubs and the Giants. The Cubs took it to win the pennant. Pittsburgh finished tied for second place with the Giants, just one game back. It was one of the closest races in baseball history.

Shortstop Honus Wagner had one of the most dominating hitting performances of all-time. The "Flying Dutchman" led the majors in batting average, on-base percentage, slugging percentage, runs batted in, and stolen bases. He missed the triple crown by two home runs. For his efforts, Wagner was paid $5,000, possibly the most on the team.

Regular season

Season summary 
The Pirates opened the season by winning three straight games in St. Louis. On Opening Day, the Pirates committed four errors while the Cardinals committed six.  Fans were concerned because Honus Wagner—who in 1907 led the National League in hitting, slugging, and stolen bases—was not at the game, and there were concerns that he was taking the year off. On April 17, Charlie Starr, who was Wagner's replacement, committed two errors. Afterwards, Wagner would sign with the Pirates. The home opener for the Pirates was a 5–1 victory for the Pirates over the Cardinals. From April 26 to May 9, the Pirates played only 3 games due to poor weather.

On June 30, the Pirates took first place, as the Chicago Cubs lost to the Cincinnati Reds.  Starting on July 2, the Pirates started a critical five game series against the Cubs. In the first game, Mordecai Brown threw a six hit, no walk shutout, winning the game 3–0. The Pirates scheduled a doubleheader on the Fourth of July and more than 30,000 fans showed up. The Cubs won the first game 2–0 as Mordecai Brown only allowed two hits.

Season standings

Record vs. opponents

Opening Day lineup

Roster

Player stats

Batting

Starters by position 
Note: Pos = Position; G = Games played; AB = At bats; H = Hits; Avg. = Batting average; HR = Home runs; RBI = Runs batted in

Other batters 
Note: G = Games played; AB = At bats; H = Hits; Avg. = Batting average; HR = Home runs; RBI = Runs batted in

Pitching

Starting pitchers 
Note: G = Games pitched; IP = Innings pitched; W = Wins; L = Losses; ERA = Earned run average; SO = Strikeouts

Other pitchers 
Note: G = Games pitched; IP = Innings pitched; W = Wins; L = Losses; ERA = Earned run average; SO = Strikeouts

Relief pitchers 
Note: G = Games pitched; W = Wins; L = Losses; SV = Saves; ERA = Earned run average; SO = Strikeouts

Awards and honors

League top five finishers 
Howie Camnitz
 #4 in NL in ERA (1.56)

Fred Clarke
 #4 in NL in runs scored (83)

Tommy Leach
 #3 in NL in runs scored (93)

Honus Wagner
 MLB leader in batting average (.354)
 MLB leader in RBI (109)
 MLB leader in stolen bases (53)
 MLB leader in on-base percentage (.415)
 MLB leader in slugging percentage (.542)
 #2 in NL in home runs (10)
 #2 in NL in runs scored (100)

Notes

References

External links
 1908 Pittsburgh Pirates team page at Baseball Reference
 1908 Pittsburgh Pirates Page at Baseball Almanac

Pittsburgh Pirates seasons
Pittsburgh Pirates season
Pittsburg Pir